Darren Bundock (born 21 March 1971) is an Australian sailor from Gosford, New South Wales. He won a silver medal in the Tornado class at the 2000 Summer Olympics in Sydney. Bundock and current crewmate Glenn Ashby are the 2007 world champions in the Tornado class and ranked number one in the event going into the 2008 Summer Olympics. However, they were beaten by the Spanish crew and won silver. He was an Australian Institute of Sport scholarship holder.

Bundock sailed with Team New Zealand in the final regatta of the 2010 Extreme Sailing Series.

Moreover, he joined America's Cup World Series team Oracle in 2011, as replacement skipper and helmsman for Russell Coutts.

References

External links 
 
 
 
 
 
 

1971 births
Living people
Australian male sailors (sport)
Australian Institute of Sport sailors
Oracle Racing sailors
Sportsmen from New South Wales
Medalists at the 2000 Summer Olympics
Team New Zealand sailors
Tornado class world champions
World champions in sailing for Australia
Olympic sailors of Australia
Olympic medalists in sailing
Olympic silver medalists for Australia
Sailors at the 2000 Summer Olympics – Tornado
Sailors at the 2004 Summer Olympics – Tornado
Sailors at the 2008 Summer Olympics – Tornado
Medalists at the 2008 Summer Olympics
21st-century Australian people